Christodora is a novel by New York City–based journalist Tim Murphy which was first published on August 2, 2016 by Grove Press.

Plot 
In Christodora, Tim Murphy tells the story of diverse characters living in an iconic building in Manhattan's East Village, the Christodora.

Milly and Jared, with their adopted son Mateo, live unexpected experiences with their neighbor Hector, a former AIDS activist and a current addict.

There are radical changes that occur in their personal lives and community: first, the 2000s hipsters rising after the 1980s junkies and protestors, then the emergence of the wealthy residents of the 2020s.

This time travelling novel illustrates the difficult human experiences behind AIDS and puts the destructive power of hard drugs under the spotlight.

Tim Murphy 
Tim Murphy is a NYC-based journalist who for two decades, worked on reporting LGBT related topics (Culture, politics, movements, etc.) through his publication in several magazines such as POZ Magazine (as an editor and staff writer), Out, The Advocate, and New York Magazine.

He got nominated for GLAAD Media Award for Outstanding Magazine Journalism, for his coverage on HIV-prevention pill regimen PrEP

He's also a contributor in The New York Times and Condé Nast Traveler.

He lives in Brooklyn and the Hudson Valley.

Awards 
 2017 : Andrew Carnegie Medal Nominee for Fiction

TV Adaptation 
Paramount Television has optioned the novel for a limited TV series. Ira Sachs and Mauricio Zacharias will write the adaptation, with Sachs to direct. It will be produced by Cary Fukunaga with his production company Parliament of Owls.

References 

2016 American novels
Historiography of LGBT in New York City
Novels set in Manhattan
East Village, Manhattan
Novels about time travel
Novels about drugs
Novels about HIV/AIDS
Grove Press books